Kathrine McAllister "Rena" Bell  (née Stewart; 13 May 1895 – 7 October 1970) was a New Zealand teacher, farmer, political organiser and educationalist. She was born in Manchester, Lancashire, England, on 13 May 1895.

In the 1966 New Year Honours, Bell was appointed a Member of the Order of the British Empire for services to education and the community, especially as chair of the Tauranga College board of governors.

References

1895 births
1970 deaths
New Zealand farmers
New Zealand women farmers
New Zealand educators
Politicians from Manchester
British emigrants to New Zealand
New Zealand Members of the Order of the British Empire
New Zealand National Party politicians
20th-century New Zealand women politicians
20th-century New Zealand politicians